The name Bret has been used for seven tropical cyclones in the Atlantic Ocean.
 Tropical Storm Bret (1981), made landfall in southern Maryland, no real damage
 Tropical Storm Bret (1987), short-lived storm, remained in the eastern Atlantic Ocean
 Tropical Storm Bret (1993), passed over Venezuela, killing 184
 Hurricane Bret (1999), strong Category 4 hurricane that hit south Texas, although damage was minimized as it hit a sparsely populated area
 Tropical Storm Bret (2005), short-lived storm, made landfall near Tuxpan, Veracruz, Mexico
 Tropical Storm Bret (2011), strong tropical storm, threatened the Bahamas before turning away
 Tropical Storm Bret (2017), formed southeast of Trinidad and affected portions of the southern Windward Islands and the Paria Peninsula of Venezuela

Atlantic hurricane set index articles